Piotrowice Nyskie  (German Peterwitz) is a village in the administrative district of Gmina Otmuchów, within Nysa County, Opole Voivodeship, in south-western Poland, close to the Czech border.

The village has a seventeenth-century former bishop's palace which is currently being restored by the author Jim Parton.

References

Piotrowice Nyskie

Palaces in Poland